Silum is a village of Liechtenstein, located in the municipality of Triesenberg.

References

External links

Villages of Liechtenstein